Muriel Smith may refer to:
 Muriel Smith (politician)
 Muriel Smith (singer)